Victor Albert Stephens (born 1931) is a Canadian former politician. He served in the Legislative Assembly of British Columbia from 1978 to 1979, as a Progressive Conservative member for the constituency of Oak Bay.

References

British Columbia Conservative Party MLAs
1931 births
Living people